Earl Sixteen (b. Earl John Daley, 9 May 1958, Kingston, Jamaica) is a reggae singer whose career began in the mid-1970s.

Biography
Daley grew up in Waltham Park Road, Kingston, and, influenced by American soul and Jamaican artists such as Dennis Brown, began his singing career by entering local talent shows. He became the lead vocalist for the group The Flaming Phonics, playing live around Jamaica. Daley decided to drop out of school to pursue his music career, which prompted his mother to throw him out of the family home. Needing to make some money, the group tried out for producer Duke Reid, but left before finishing their recording for him due to his habit of firing live gunshots in the studio. They then worked with Herman Chin Loy, with Daley cutting his first solo track, "Hey baby". The group split up, with Daley concentrating on his solo career.  Daley recorded "Malcolm X" for producer Joe Gibbs in 1975 - a track written by his school-friend Winston McAnuff, and which was later successfully covered by Dennis Brown. In 1977, he joined Boris Gardiner's group, The Boris Gardiner Happening, which brought him into contact with Lee "Scratch" Perry. In the late 1970s, after a spell with Derrick Harriott, Daley recorded four tracks at Perry's Black Ark studio, including the original recording of "White Belly Rat", also meeting Earl Morgan of The Heptones, who later produced his album, Shining Star. In the early 1980s he recorded singles for a variety of producers including Linval Thompson, Augustus Pablo, Clement Dodd, Sugar Minott, Yabby You, and Derrick Harriott, and recorded his debut album with Mikey Dread. He teamed up with Roy Cousins for two albums, Julie and Special Request. Earlier material recorded for Studio One was released as 1985's Showcase album.

In 1985, after spending time in the United States, he relocated to England, fathering a child. His child's mother knew Mad Professor, who Daley began working with. He also worked with other British producers such as Stafford Douglas. One of his tracks from this era was a cover version of "Holding Back The Years", which had been a big hit for Simply Red. Returning to Jamaica, he worked briefly with King Jammy. In the 1990s he made guest appearances on tracks by Leftfield, and he has been one of the two vocalists for the UK electronica/reggae band Dreadzone since 1995. He signed to WEA for his major label debut album, 1997's Steppin' Out, which was nominated for a MOBO award. Earl has continued touring and working with Dreadzone band, as well as joining Leftfield on tours.

Recently, Earl has been working with producers in the UK and Europe, as well as doing shows with Thomas Evers of Rockers Artist Agency, worldwide as a Reggae Ambassador. He started his own label, Merge Production, releasing previously unreleased vinyl from the 1970s and 1980s. He also released an album on Merge Production, "Walls Of The City" - Earl 16 Meets Nick Manasseh in March 2013, featuring both British and international artists, on vinyl, digital download and CD.

Discography

Albums
Reggae Sounds (1981) DATC
Julie (1982) Roy Cousins
Super Duper (1982) Time
Special Request (1983) Roy Cousins
Shining Star (1983) Vista
Songs For a Reason (1983) Vista
Songs of Love and Hardship (1984) Kingdom
Showcase (1985) Studio One
Year 2000 (198?) Oswald Music
Babylon Walls (1991) Ariwa
Boss Man (1992) Carib Sounds
Not For Sale (1993) Next Step
Phoenix of Peace (1993)
Rootsman (1994) Rhino
Steppin' Out (1997) WEA
Wonderous Works (2000) Gussie P
Cyber Roots (2001) Epark
Soldiers of Jah Army (2003) Patate
Mash Up The Dance: Earl Sixteen live with No More Babylon BMG
Feel The Fire WEA Allemagne
Wake Up (2006) Ariwa
The Fittest (2011) JahSolidRock Music/HeartBeat Europe
Walls of the City [Earl 16 Meets Nick Manasseh] (2014)
Earl 16 vs. Ken Parker (2016) Roy Cousins

Selected singles
"Freedom" (1977) Upsetter
"Trials and Crosses" (1981) Thompson Sound
"No Mash Up the Dance" [Earl Sixteen and Mike Brooks] (1993) Top Beat
"Can't Conquer We" (2005) King Shiloh
"The Joker" [Earl 16 with The Mighty Dub Generators] (2014) Scion Recordings
"Red" (2015) Roots Inspiration

Appearances
"Release the Pressure" Leftfield (12", 1992)
Second Light Dreadzone (1995)
"Zion Youth" [Dreadzone] (1995)
"Life, Love and Unity" [Dreadzone] (1995)
Leftism [Leftfield] (1996)
"Release the Pressure" [Leftfield] (1996)
Biological Radio [Dreadzone] (1997)
Sound [Dreadzone]  (2001)
Laika Come Home (Spacemonkeyz vs. Gorillaz) (2002) 
Once Upon a Time [Dreadzone] (2005)
Eye on the Horizon [Dreadzone] (2010)
Escapades [Dreadzone] (2013)
Dread Times [Dreadzone] (2017)
Dreadzone Presents Dubwiser Volume One (2019)
Space Song [Dubioza kolektiv] (2020)

References

External links
Earl Sixteen at Roots Archives

1958 births
Living people
Musicians from Kingston, Jamaica
Jamaican reggae musicians